Bishop Alvise was a Bishop of Arras in the 12th century.

The son of Einard and Hostina, he was a native of Flanders but his year of birth is controversial, with sources claiming 1060, 1070 or 1075.

According to medieval chroniclers,  he had been a novice and Canon of the Abbey of Saint Bertin at Saint-Omer. He participated in the second crusade with Louis VII of France and according to some sources, he fell ill at Philippopolis, Thrace and died September 6, 1148.

References 

Bishops of Arras
Roman Catholic monks
Year of birth unknown